Mantrap, released in the United States as Man in Hiding, is a 1953 whodunit directed by Terence Fisher, starring Paul Henreid.

Plot
A falsely convicted murderer escapes prison to seek out who the real killer is and to clear his name.

Cast
Paul Henreid as Hugo Bishop
Lois Maxwell as Thelma Speight
Kieron Moore as Speight
Hugh Sinclair as Maurice Jerrard
Lloyd Lamble as Inspector Frisnay
Anthony Forwood as Rex
Bill Travers as Victor Tasman
Mary Laura Wood as Susie Martin
Kay Kendall as Vera Gorringe
Conrad Phillips as Det. Sgt. Barker
John Stuart as Doctor

Production
The film was based on the 1952 novel Queen in Danger by Elleston Trevor. It was made by Hammer Films and shot at the Bray Studios and on location in London, mostly near St Paul's Cathedral.

Paul Henreid had previously made Stolen Face for the Lipperts and did it for the same low salary and percentage of the profits.

References

External links

1953 films
1953 crime films
British black-and-white films
British crime films
Films directed by Terence Fisher
Films based on British novels
Hammer Film Productions films
Films set in London
1950s English-language films
1950s British films